Sybra nubila is a species of beetle in the family Cerambycidae. It was described by Pascoe in 1863.

References

nubila
Beetles described in 1863